Cyladinae is a subfamily of sweet potato weevils in the family of beetles known as Brentidae. There are two genera in Cyladinae, Cylas Latreille 1802, and the extinct genus Miocenocylas Legalov 2018.

References

Further reading

External links

Brentidae
Articles created by Qbugbot